33 Brompton Place (1982) is a five-part miniseries that was broadcast on Showtime Networks in the United States and Global in Canada. It was filmed in Winnipeg, Manitoba, Canada.

References 

1980s American drama television series
1980s Canadian drama television series
1982 American television series debuts
1982 Canadian television series debuts
1982 American television series endings
1982 Canadian television series endings
Global Television Network original programming
Showtime (TV network) original programming
Television shows filmed in Winnipeg